GEN1, Holliday junction 5' flap endonuclease is a protein that in humans is encoded by the GEN1 gene.

Function

This gene encodes a member of the Rad2/xeroderma pigmentosum group G nuclease family, whose members are characterized by N-terminal and internal xeroderma pigmentosum group G nuclease domains followed by helix-hairpin-helix domains and disordered C-terminal domains. The protein encoded by this gene is involved in resolution of Holliday junctions, which are intermediate four-way structures that covalently link DNA during homologous recombination and double-strand break repair. The protein resolves Holliday junctions by creating dual incisions across the junction to produce nicked duplex products that can be ligated. In addition, this protein has been found to localize to centrosomes where it has been implicated in regulation of centrosome integrity. Alternative splicing results in multiple transcript variants. [provided by RefSeq, Jul 2016].

Redundancy with EME1/MUS81

The GEN1 endonuclease shares redundancy with the EME1/MUS81 protein complex for DNA damage repair  in mammalian cells. GEN1 and EME1/MUS81, in mice, have redundant functions with respect to their contributions to Holliday junction processing.  When mice had homozygous mutations for both Gen1 and Eme1, they exhibited synthetic lethality at an early embryonic stage.  Gen1 mutant homozygosity, alone, in mice did not cause a DNA repair deficiency.  However if mice homozygous for mutant Gen1 were also heterozyous for an Emc1 mutation, they displayed elevated sensitivity to DNA damaging agents.  These observations indicated that GEN1 and EME1 have redundant roles in DNA repair.  Gen1 and Emc1 also appear to have redundant roles in meiotic recombination.

References

Further reading